Cormano-Brusuglio railway station was a railway station located in the province of Milan, Lombardy in Italy. It served the town of Cormano and it's suburb Brusuglio. The building is still located in Via Antonio Gramsci, but the station was closed and later replaced by the Cormano-Cusano Milanino railway station on 26 April 2015.

Services
Until the station was replaced, Cormano-Brusuglio was served by the Milan–Asso railway, operated by the Lombardy railway company Ferrovie Nord Milano.

See also
 Milan–Asso railway

External links

 Ferrovienord official site - Cormano-Brusuglio railway station 

Ferrovienord
Railway stations opened in 1879
Railway stations closed in 2015